Edwina Panzer "Eddy" Dalton (born June 12, 1936) is a former first lady of Virginia, United States. After the death of her husband, John N. Dalton, she ran as a Republican for the Senate of Virginia, serving one term from 1988 to 1992. In 1989, she ran unsuccessfully against Don Beyer for Lieutenant Governor of Virginia.

References

External links
 

Living people
1936 births
Radford University alumni
Republican Party Virginia state senators
First Ladies and Gentlemen of Virginia
Women state legislators in Virginia
20th-century American women politicians
20th-century American politicians
Politicians from New York City
21st-century American women